The Wichita Terminal Association  is a switching and terminal railroad in northern Wichita, Kansas, jointly owned by the BNSF Railway and Union Pacific Railroad. It handles mainly grain and some scrap steel, serving customers at the former Wichita Union Stock Yards. The tracks were first placed in service in September 1889 by the stockyard and packing companies, and in February 1910 operations were transferred to the new WTA, owned by the Atchison, Topeka and Santa Fe Railway, Chicago, Rock Island and Pacific Railway, Missouri Pacific Railway, and St. Louis and San Francisco Railroad. Through mergers, and the sale of the Rock Island's line to the Oklahoma, Kansas and Texas Railroad, the current split between BNSF and UP came about.

References

Kansas railroads
Switching and terminal railroads
Railway companies established in 1910
American companies established in 1910
BNSF Railway
Union Pacific Railroad